Herbert Murray MC (11 December 1885 – 20 July 1918) was a Scottish professional football forward who played in the Scottish League for a number of clubs, principally Aberdeen.

Personal life 
Murray's brother Arthur was also a footballer. Murray attended Robert Gordon's College, Aberdeen University and taught at Robert Gordon Technical College. In early 1915, with the First World War underway, Murray enlisted in the Gordon Highlanders and received a commission on 9 August 1915. He was severely wounded on the Western Front in mid-1915 and sent back to Britain, where he served as a musketry instructor. He returned to the front in April 1917 and was awarded the Military Cross for bravery in the field during the German spring offensive in March 1918. Murray was serving with the rank of captain when he was killed in the Bois de Courton, near Épernay, on 20 July 1918, during the Second Battle of the Marne. He was buried in Marfaux British Cemetery.

Honours 
Aberdeen
 Fleming Charity Cup: 1909–10

Career statistics

References 

Scottish footballers
1918 deaths
British Army personnel of World War I
British military personnel killed in World War I
1885 births
People educated at Robert Gordon's College
Gordon Highlanders officers
Scottish Football League players
Arbroath F.C. players
Footballers from Aberdeen
East Stirlingshire F.C. players
Association football forwards
Clyde F.C. players
Aberdeen F.C. players
Queen's Park F.C. players
St Johnstone F.C. players
Scottish educators
Alumni of the University of Aberdeen
Academics of Robert Gordon University
Recipients of the Military Cross
Motherwell F.C. players